The XEV Yoyo is a 3D printed electric city car manufactured by Italian-Hong Kong-based startup XEV.

Overview
XEV designed this car using only 57 components. The only parts that are not 3D printed are the chassis, seats and glass components. The 3D printing materials used include enhanced nylon, polylactic acid, and thermoplastic polyurethane.

The production model was presented for the first time in September 2021 at the IAA in Munich, and was also exhibited at the 2022 Paris Motor Show. It has interchangeable batteries.

References

External links
 Official website

Electric cars
Production electric cars